Marc Joel Bola (born 9 December 1997) is an English professional footballer who plays for Middlesbrough, as a left back.

Early and personal life
Bola grew up supporting Arsenal, the team he started his professional career at. He is of Congolese descent.

Career
Born in London Borough of Greenwich, Bola joined Arsenal Academy when he was 13 after being spotted playing Sunday league football and at 16, he earned a scholarship. After progressing through the ranks, he was promoted to the reserve side. At the reserve side, Bola became a regular there and scored his first goal for the reserve side on 9 March 2016, in a 3–3 draw against Fulham U23.

Bola turned professional with Arsenal in April 2016.

Bola moved on loan to Notts County in January 2017. He made his Notts County debut on 4 February 2017, where he played 53 minutes, in a 2–0 loss against Accrington Stanley, and went on to make 13 appearances for the side before returning to his parent club at the end of the season.

In July 2017, he signed a season-long loan deal with Bristol Rovers. Bola made his Bristol Rovers debut on 16 September 2017, in a 3–0 loss against Wigan Athletic.

He was released by Arsenal at the end of the 2017–18 season. Following his release he signed for Blackpool on a one-year contract. He was sent off in September 2018, but the club appealed to the FA who overruled it and rescinded the three-match ban.

Bola joined Middlesbrough on 28 July 2019 for an undisclosed fee. He scored on his debut for Middlesbrough in an EFL Cup tie against Crewe Alexandra on 13 August 2019. On 10 January 2020 he returned to Blackpool on loan until the end of the 2019–20 season.

Controversy
In September 2021, Bola was officially charged with "aggravated misconduct" by the FA for posting a tweet that "made a reference to sexual orientation" nine years ago, at the age of 14.

Career statistics

Playing style
Bola plays primarily as a left back, but can also play as a centre back and a striker.

References

1997 births
Living people
English footballers
English sportspeople of Democratic Republic of the Congo descent
Arsenal F.C. players
Notts County F.C. players
Bristol Rovers F.C. players
Blackpool F.C. players
Middlesbrough F.C. players
English Football League players
Association football fullbacks
Black British sportsmen